Cultural intelligence or cultural quotient (CQ) is the ability to relate and work effectively across cultures, bearing similarity to the term cultural agility. The term has been used in business, education, government, and academic research contexts. Originally, the term cultural intelligence and the abbreviation "CQ" was developed in research by Christopher Earley (2002) and Earley and Soon Ang (2003). During the same period, researchers David Thomas and Kerr Inkson worked on a complementary framework of CQ as well. A few years later, Ang Soon and Linn Van Dyne worked on a scale development of the CQ construct as a research-based way of measuring and predicting intercultural performance.

The term is relatively recent: early definitions and studies of the concepts were given by P. Christopher Earley and Soon Ang in the book Cultural Intelligence: Individual Interactions Across Cultures (2003) and more fully developed later by David Livermore in the book, Leading with Cultural Intelligence. The concept is related to that of cross-cultural competence. However, it goes beyond that to actually look at intercultural capabilities as a form of intelligence that can be measured and developed. According to Earley, Ang, and Van Dyne, cultural intelligence can be defined as "a person's capability to adapt as she interacts with others from different cultural regions", and has behavioral, motivational, and metacognitive aspects. Without cultural intelligence, both business and military actors seeking to engage foreigners are susceptible to mirror imaging.

Cultural intelligence (CQ) is measured on a scale similar to that used to measure an individual's intelligence quotient. People with higher CQs are regarded as better able to successfully blend into any environment, using more effective business practices, than those with a lower CQ. CQ is assessed using the academically validated assessment created by Linn Van Dyne and Soon Ang. Both self-assessments and multi-rater assessments are available through the Cultural Intelligence Center in East Lansing, Michigan and the Center makes the CQ Scale available to other academic researchers at no charge. Research demonstrates that CQ is a consistent predictor of performance in multicultural settings.  Cultural intelligence research has been cited and peer-reviewed in more than seventy academic journals. The research and application of cultural intelligence is being driven by the Cultural Intelligence Center in the U.S. and Nanyang Business School in Singapore. Additional research and application of cultural intelligence has been conducted by Liliana Gil Valletta, who holds the trademark for the term since 2013. Defined as the ability to be aware of, understand, and apply cultural competence to everyday business decisions, Gil Valletta has expanded the definition of cultural intelligence into a capability that yields a commercial advantage by turning cultural trends into profits and P&L impact. Since 2010, the firm CIEN+ and data science platform Culturintel is the first to use artificial intelligence and big data tools to report measures of cultural intelligence and enable corporations to embed inclusion for business growth.

Four CQ capabilities 
Ang, Van Dyne, & Livermore describe four CQ capabilities: motivation (CQ Drive), cognition (CQ Knowledge), meta-cognition (CQ Strategy) and behavior (CQ Action). CQ Assessments report scores on all four capabilities as well as several sub-dimensions for each capability. The four capabilities stem from the intelligence-based approach to intercultural adjustment and performance.

CQ-Drive
CQ-Drive is a person's interest and confidence in functioning effectively in culturally diverse settings. It includes:
 Intrinsic interest – deriving enjoyment from culturally diverse experiences
 Extrinsic interest – gaining benefits from culturally diverse experiences.
 Self-efficacy – having the confidence to be effective in culturally diverse situations

CQ-Knowledge
CQ-Knowledge is a person's knowledge about how cultures are similar and how cultures are different. It includes:
 Business – knowledge about economic and legal systems
 Interpersonal – knowledge about values, social interaction norms, and religious beliefs
 Socio-linguistics – knowledge about rules of languages and rules for expressing non-verbal behaviors

CQ-Strategy
CQ-Strategy is how a person makes sense of culturally diverse experiences. It occurs when people make judgments about their own thought processes and those of others. It includes:
 Awareness – knowing about one's existing cultural knowledge;
 Planning – strategizing before a culturally diverse encounter;
 Checking – checking assumptions and adjusting mental maps when actual experiences differ from expectations.

CQ-Action
CQ-Action is a person's capability to adapt verbal and nonverbal behavior to make it appropriate to diverse cultures. It involves having a flexible repertoire of behavioral responses that suit a variety of situations. It includes:
 Non-verbal – modifying non-verbal behaviors (e.g., gestures, facial expressions)
 Verbal – modifying verbal behaviors (e.g., accent, tone)

Additional research on cultural intelligence is being conducted by academics around the globe, including research on culturally intelligent organizations, the correlation between neuroscience and the development of cultural intelligence, and situational judgment making and CQ Assessment.

In business
Cultural intelligence, also known within business as "cultural quotient" or "CQ", is a theory within management and organisational psychology, positing that understanding the impact of an individual's cultural background on their behaviour is essential for effective business, and measuring an individual's ability to engage successfully in any environment or social setting.

Elaine Mosakowski and her husband Christopher Earley in the October 2004 issue of Harvard Business Review described cultural intelligence. CQ has been gaining acceptance throughout the business community. CQ teaches strategies to improve cultural perception in order to distinguish behaviors driven by culture from those specific to an individual, suggesting that allowing knowledge and appreciation of the difference to guide responses results in better business practice.

Since 2010 and as presented in academia, national television, and other industry forums, Liliana Gil Valletta and the firm CIEN+ have expanded the definition and application of cultural intelligence from the individual to the organizational construct and architecture. Their model allows corporations and business teams to assess their level of cultural intelligence excellence index (Cix) based on how well they integrate cross-cultural analytics, insights, metrics, rewards, senior support, R&D, and profit plans to make inclusion the default. As defined by Gil Valletta, traditional CQ focuses on achieving individual competence while Cix focuses on achieving commercial growth.

CQ is developed through:
 cognitive means: the head (learning about your own and other cultures, and cultural diversity)
 physical means: the body (using your senses and adapting your movements and body language to blend in)
 motivational means: the emotions (gaining rewards and strength from acceptance and success)

Ilan Alon, Michele Boulange, Judith Meyer, and Vasyl Taras have developed a new survey they call the BCIQ (Business Cultural Intelligence Quotient). While not rooted in the academic literature on multiple loci of intelligence, the survey provides practitioners with a tool to reflect on their understanding for use in an international management context

The only peer-reviewed measurement of CQ is the multi-rater assessment developed by Soon Ang and Linn Van Dyne.

In government
Cultural intelligence refers to the cognitive, motivational, and behavioral capacities to understand and effectively respond to the beliefs, values, attitudes, and behaviors of individuals and groups under complex and changing circumstances in order to effect the desired change. The application and integration of cultural intelligence into the workings and practices of local government is advanced by community planner, Anindita Mitra in 2016 as a way to improve the effectiveness of local governments to respond to and serve a growing and diverse population.

Cultural knowledge and warfare are bound together as cultural intelligence is central to ensuring successful military operations. Culture is composed of factors including language, society, economy, customs, history, and religion. For military operations, cultural intelligence concerns the ability to make decisions based on an understanding of these factors.

In the military sense, cultural intelligence is a complicated pursuit of anthropology, psychology, communications, sociology, history, and above all, military doctrine.

Diplomatic implications 

Diplomacy is the conduct by government officials of negotiations and other relations between nations. The use of cultural intelligence and other methods of soft power has been endorsed and encouraged as a primary tool of statecraft as opposed to more coercive forms of national power; its further development is being stressed as a primary exercise of power as opposed to the expensive (politically and financial) coercive options such as military action or economic sanctions. For example, in 2007, US Secretary of Defense Robert Gates called for "strengthening our capacity to use 'soft' power and for better integrating it with 'hard' power," stating that using these other instruments "could make it less likely that military force will have to be used in the first place, as local problems might be dealt with before they become crises." In a speech in 2006, Secretary of State Condoleezza Rice urged similar actions in support of her doctrine of "transformational diplomacy;" she made a similar speech, again, in 2008.

Governmental negotiation and other diplomatic efforts can be made much more effective if the knowledge of people is understood and practiced with skill. Joseph Nye, a leading political scientist, asserts in his book Soft Power that "a country may obtain the outcomes it wants in world politics because other countries – admiring its values, emulating its example, aspiring to its level of prosperity and openness – want to follow it. In this sense, it is also important to set the agenda and attract others in world politics, and not only to force them to change by threatening military force or economic sanctions. This soft power – getting others to want the outcomes that you want – co-opts people rather than coerces them."

The sorts of effects Nye describes are much more effective if there is a willingness on the part of the influencing agent to respect and understand the other agent's cultural background. An example of diplomacy was a provision within the USA PATRIOT Act "condemning discrimination against Arab and Muslim Americans" response to the events of 9/11. This provision ensures the protection of U.S. Muslims and Arabs, ensures a distinction between them and those that committed those terrorist acts, and lives up to the ideals of the U.S. constitution of non-discrimination. This precedent sets up an attitude of awareness of and respect for peaceful, law-abiding Muslims.

However, cultural intelligence can be used to the opposite effect. In 2006 and 2007, Russian president Vladimir Putin supposedly used his knowledge of German chancellor Angela Merkel and her fear of dogs to intimidate her during negotiations by bringing his Labrador Retriever, Koni.

In the U.S. military
Cultural intelligence as a U.S. military term did not gain prominence until the late 20th century with the rise of low-intensity and counterinsurgency warfare. However, the importance of cultural intelligence has only recently become commonly accepted with the counterinsurgency campaigns the U.S. has conducted in Afghanistan and Iraq.

Since the Iraq War and the War in Afghanistan, cultural intelligence has been seen as playing a more important role in the success of military operations in counterinsurgency. The U.S. Army and Marine Corps counterinsurgency field manual is explicit on this point:

"Cultural knowledge is essential to waging a successful counterinsurgency," and goes further, urging "counterinsurgents… should strive to avoid imposing their ideals of normalcy on a foreign cultural problem."

The manual's logic is that the "primary goal of any COIN operation is to foster the development of effective governance by a legitimate government." The manual points out that different cultures have different ideas of what legitimacy entails, and that operations at building legitimacy need to meet the host nation's peoples' criteria. Failure to recognize and respect a host nation's culture has resulted in the deaths of some NATO troops, and attempts have been made to make Afghans aware of Western culture and vice versa to mitigate some of these unintentional effects.

Human Terrain System 

To this effect, the U.S. Army developed the Human Terrain System in February 2007 to provide cultural information of host nations. The HTS program was the primary unified effort to provide this information to supplement military operations in areas where armed services were deployed. The program was also controversial, with the American Anthropological Association arguing that such efforts represented a conflict of interest and a possible violation of the ethical standards of anthropologists; but it was defended by others as ethical. The U.S. Army Human Terrain System ended operations in September 2014.

See also
 Cosmopolitanism
 Cultural anthropology
 Intercultural communication
 Intercultural competence
 Information warfare
 Intelligence cycle
 Organisational culture
 Psychological warfare

References

Further reading
   
 
 Ang, S. and Van Dyne L (eds). (2008) "The Handbook of Cultural Intelligence." New York: ME Sharpe 
 Livermore, David A. (2011). "The Cultural Intelligence Difference." New York: AMACOM 
 Middleton, Julia (2014). "Cultural Intelligence: CQ: The Competitive Edge for Leaders Crossing Borders." London: A&C Black Business Information and Development

External links
  Huffington Post 'Teaching Cultural Intelligence Could Provide Advantages In Job Market'
 Forbes 'CQ: The Test Of Your Potential For Cross-Cultural Success'
 Economist 'In Search of High CQ'
 The Times 'Trend watch: Cultural intelligence' 2 December 2004
 NBC's Education Nation ' CQ: The New IQ for American Students Competing in a Global Marketplace

Business terms
Management
Multiculturalism
Organizational behavior
Military intelligence
Culture
Cultural concepts